The Paras is a 1983 BBC TV documentary series about British Parachute Regiment recruits of 480 (Training) Platoon undertaking their basic training at the Depot of the Parachute Regiment (Depot Para) at Aldershot Garrison between January and June 1982. The series was broadcast on BBC1 in March and April 1983. It was later repeated in 1984, with an update on the platoon members' lives in the last episode.

Narrated by Glyn Worsnip, it was shot in the fly-on-the-wall style, giving the viewing public a unique insight to military life. Production of the programme started just prior to the Falklands War.

The series was accompanied by a book of the same name written by the principal researcher Frank Hilton 

The series was accompanied by a score of military music written and arranged by Conn Bernard.

Some of those recruits passing out in 1982 went on to have long and distinguished careers including Dean Ward and Rod Stoner. In addition one of the platoon staff corporals, Al Slater was later killed in Northern Ireland whilst a member of the SAS. This incident and some of this involvement in the SAS were described in two of Andy McNab's books Immediate Action and Seven Troop.

Production credits
Written and presented – Glyn Worsnip
Camera – Dave Gray
Sound – Mervyn Broadway
Dubbing Editor – David Matthews
Dubbing Mixer – Ken Haimes
Title Music – Conn Bernard
Graphic Designer – William Blaik
Production Assistant – Caroline Savage
Research – Frank Hilton, Chris Wilkie
Film Editor – Graham Dean
Series Editor – David Harrison
Producer – Bill Jones

Episodes

See also
The Paras: Men Of War

References

BBC television documentaries
Parachute Regiment (United Kingdom)
British military television series
1980s British documentary television series
1983 British television series debuts
1983 British television series endings